Ultimate Collection is a 1998 album by Patsy Cline.

Track listing
 "Walkin' After Midnight"  – 2:35
 "A Church, a Courtroom, and Then Goodbye"  – 3:03
 "Lovesick Blues"  – 2:19
 "Honky Tonk Merry Go Round"  – 2:21
 "Three Cigarettes in an Ashtray"  – 2:15
 "The Heart You Break May Be Your Own"  – 2:32
 "Cry Not for Me"  – 2:30
 "In Care of the Blues"  – 2:33
 "Don't Ever Leave Me Again"  – 2:27
 "A Stranger in My Arms"  – 2:28
 "Too Many Secrets"  – 2:17
 "Today, Tomorrow and Forever"  – 2:38
 "Pick Me Up on Your Way Down"  – 2:18
 "Gotta Lot of Rhythm in My Soul"  – 2:21
 "Just Out of Reach"  – 2:30
 "I Can See an Angel"  – 2:22
 "A Poor Man's Roses (Or a Rich Man's Gold)"  – 2:36
 "I'm Blue Again"  – 2:10
 "Just a Closer Walk With Thee"  – 2:48
 "Hungry for Love"  – 2:30
 "Ain't No Wheels on This Ship"  – 1:55
 "Never No More"  – 2:38
 "Let the Teardrops Fall"  – 2:34
 "Love, Love, Love Me, Honey Do"  – 2:04
 "There He Goes"  – 2:25
 "I Don't Wanna"  – 2:25
 "I Cried All the Way to the Altar"  – 2:23
 "How Can I Face Tomorrow"  – 2:17
 "I've Loved and Lost Again"  – 2:36
 "Stop, Look and Listen"  – 2:23

Chart performance

References

Patsy Cline albums
1998 compilation albums